Azarov government may refer to a government of Ukrainian prime minister Mykola Azarov:

 First Azarov government, 11 March, 2010 to 3 December, 2012
 Second Azarov government, 24 December 2012 to 28 January 2014.